Schallenberg Pass (el. 1167 m.) is a high mountain pass in the canton of Berne in Switzerland.

It connects Steffisburg and Marbach. The pass road has a maximum grade of 10 percent.

See also
 List of highest paved roads in Europe
 List of mountain passes
List of the highest Swiss passes

Mountain passes of Switzerland
Mountain passes of the canton of Bern